A total of 455 players have appeared for Western Australia in men's first-class cricket matches since the team's first-class debut during the 1892–93 Australian cricket season. As of the end of the 2012–13 season, Western Australia as a team has played in exactly 700 first-class matches, the majority against other Australian states in the Sheffield Shield.

List
Statistics included are only for matches played for Western Australia
Players who hold a state contract for the 2015–16 season are marked with an asterisk (*)
Players who have played international cricket are highlighted in  blue
Statistics are correct as of the midpoint of the 2015–16 season:

Notes

See also
List of Western Australia List A cricketers
List of Western Australia Twenty20 cricketers

References

Western Australia, First Class

Western Australia, First Class